The Clue of the New Pin (1961) is a British crime film directed by Allan Davis and starring Paul Daneman, Bernard Archard and James Villiers. It was one of the series of Edgar Wallace Mysteries, British second-features, produced at Merton Park Studios in the 1960s.

This film is an adaptation of the 1923 novel The Clue of the New Pin by Edgar Wallace, which was also made into a film in 1929.

Plot
TV journalist Tab Holland assists Scotland yard with the murder of a reclusive millionaire whose corpse is discovered locked in a vault. The key to the vault is mysteriously found on the table beside the corpse.

Partial cast
 Paul Daneman - Rex Lander
 Bernard Archard - Superintendent Carver
 James Villiers - Tab Holland
 Katherine Woodville - Jane Ardfern
 Clive Morton - Ramsey Brown
 Leslie Sands - Sergeant Harris
 David Horne - John Trasmere
 Ruth Kettlewell - Mrs Rushby
 Wolfe Morris - Yeh Ling
 Maudie Edwards - Barmaid

Critical reception
TV Guide called it "slightly better than most of the 47 Edgar Wallace second features that producer Greenwood put out between 1960 and 1963."

References

External links

1961 films
British black-and-white films
1961 crime films
Edgar Wallace Mysteries
Films based on British novels
Films scored by Ron Goodwin
British crime films
1960s English-language films
1960s British films